Viadana is a comune (municipality) in the Province of Mantua in the Italian region Lombardy, located about  southeast of Milan and about  southwest of Mantua.

Viadana borders the following municipalities: Boretto, Borgo Virgilio, Brescello, Casalmaggiore, Commessaggio, Dosolo, Gazzuolo, Marcaria, Mezzani, Motteggiana, Pomponesco, Sabbioneta, Suzzara.

It is the hometown of Rugby Viadana.

Physical geography 
The municipal territory lies at the southwestern end of the province of Mantua and borders three other provinces: Cremona (municipality of Casalmaggiore), Parma (municipality of Mezzani), and Reggio nell'Emilia (municipalities of Boretto and Brescello). The territory is completely flat and is watered by the Po River along its entire southern border and by the Oglio River for much of its northern border.

The territory of Viadana is part of the geographical area called Bassa Padana, and with its 102.50 km² area, Viadana is the largest municipality in the province of Mantua.

Geology 
Viadana is located near the Piadena anticline, which, according to some authors, was the epicenter of the violent January 3, 1117 earthquake that struck the Po Valley.

Climate 
The climate in Viadana is very humid: hot and muggy in summer, cold with cold temperatures in winter.

History 
The presence of man on the islands formed by the Po and its tributaries, Adda and Oglio, has recently been confirmed by the numerous finds of artifacts attributed to the Neolithic period, dating from around the 4th millennium B.C. and now housed in the museum dedicated to its founder, Monsignor Antonio Parazzi. It is to this Viadanese man that the discovery of various archaeological sites, both from the Bronze Age and the Roman period, belongs. The territory of Viadana, an integral part of the Cremona countryside, still preserves much evidence of the ancient Roman conquest, such as the very orientation of the countryside: 14° NE/SW. Located in the diocese of Cremona and the committee of Brescia, it reached administrative unity in the 14th century.

The Cavalcabò family, landlords of the place, whose jurisdiction had been conferred by Emperor Frederick I on July 30, 1158, issued statutes in the mid-14th century that remained in force until the early 19th century.

In 1415 following the conquest of Gian Francesco Gonzaga, Viadana bound itself permanently to Mantua except for a brief period in the 19th century thanks to the treaty signed by Pavesino Avigni. Over time there were also corrosion and floods caused by the Po and the Oglio, which caused entire villas to disappear, until the present territorial layout, of about 102 km², was achieved, protected by mighty embankments, even recently reinforced. The rivers were also communication and trade routes that developed especially along the Po axis to Venice, to such an extent that Viadana was the seat of a Vice-Admiral appointed from Mantua; not only that: an area once owned by the Del Bon family, which owned real estate and commercial and industrial activities in the lagoon city, still bears the name of Villa del Veneziano. On April 8, 1530, Charles V, in awarding Marquis Frederick II the title of Duke, granted that the eldest male son bear the title of Marquis of Viadana, elevating the territory into an autonomous marquisate, distinct from the Duchy of Mantua. Belonging to the main branch of the Gonzaga family, Viadana did not have a mint, maintained a certain economic autonomy, and had its own currency and special weights and measures for trading. Gonzaga rule ended on July 23, 1708, when the Habsburg Empire, having declared the glorious Mantuan family forfeit, regained possession of its fiefs. Viadana until 1580 had been governed by a Podestà, appointed from Mantua, then by a Governor; these were assisted in their functions by a lieutenant, usually a Viadanese with a law degree, and by an appointed council, or Uomini di Viadana, consisting of 40 members.

The marquisate was finally suppressed in 1771 and aggregated with Austrian Lombardy. And to this the municipality belonged, after the French interludes, until the Peace of Villafranca in 1859 in which it was assigned to the Province of Cremona. On July 1, 1868 it returned to Mantua. Prominent among the relics in the sphragistics collection of the Civic Museum is a high hierarchical seal of the Knights of Altopascio, depicting St. James. Found in the area, it harkens back to medieval pilgrimages and the probable presence of an important hospice near the Po River, which had to be crossed in both directions for those traveling along the German road.

Settlements from Greek and Roman times have survived.

From medieval times there are records of a fortress area (the present "Public Gardens" and the building of the elementary schools and Technical Institute) and walls that marked the perimeter of the village, which were destroyed in 1700 and along the route of which currently runs Via Circonvallazione Fosse. Also documented within the walls is the presence of the churches of S. Maria Assunta and S. Cristoforo in Castello (opposite the former Verdi cinema). For example, Parmigianino took refuge here during the siege of Parma in 1521.

In 2003 Dario Fo is in Viadana with eclectic artist Marco Cagnolati, at MuVi, in the "Patashow" gags, in which they wore each other's hats. Also at MuVi is an exhibition dedicated to Dario Fo, "Puppets with Anger and Feeling," in which he exhibits his paintings and sketches.

It became quite famous in Europe in the 2000s thanks to the town's 15-a-side rugby team, Viadana, which participates annually in European competitions in addition to winning the Scudetto in 2002 and six Italian Cups and Trophies Eccellenza. From 2010 to 2012, it found itself even more at the center of the national and international scene, thanks to the birth of the Aironi franchise, based right in the city of Viadana. Together with Benetton, they are the only two Italian rugby teams to represent the country in the prestigious professional Celtic League, a competition previously reserved exclusively for clubs from Scotland, Ireland and Wales. However, the experience is short-lived; after only two sporting seasons, on April 6, 2012, the FIR decides to revoke the license at the end of the current season for economic reasons.

Symbols 
The coat of arms was recognized by decree of the head of government dated June 2, 1934.[8
 "Of green, to the lion of gold, seated on a cushion of red, and holding with its front branches a double lily. Outward ornaments from City."

The gonfalon was granted by royal decree on February 22, 1940, and consists of a yellow banner.

The civic flag, granted by Presidential Decree of July 15, 2004,is a drape of green, charged centrally with the golden lion, seated on a cushion of red, grasping with its front paws the two golden lilies, placed in pole, united, the lower one upside down; the part at the pole charged by the pole, interspersed in pole, of green, red, yellow.

Monuments and places of interest

Religious architectures 
In the town of Viadana:

 Chiesa arcipretale di Santa Maria Assunta e San Cristoforo in Castello, on piazza Gramsci.
 Chiesa di San Pietro Apostolo, on via Aroldi.
 Chiesa di San Rocco e San Sebastiano, già Oratorio dei Confratelli Neri del SS. Crocifisso, on via San Rocco.
 Chiesa di San Martino e San Nicola, on via Cavour.
 Chiesa di Santa Maria Annunziata, on piazza Solferino.

In municipal hamlets:

 Chiesa di Santa Giulia, in the hamlet of Cicognara.
 Chiesa dei SS. Filippo e Giacomo Apostoli, in the hamlet of Cogozzo.
 Chiesa del Santo Spirito, in the hamlet of Buzzoleto.
 Basilica insigne dei SS. Stefano e Anna, in the hamlet of Cavallara.
 Chiesa di San Giacomo Maggiore, in the hamlet of Cizzolo.
 Chiesa di San Antonino Abate, in the hamlet of Salina.
 Chiesa di San Ignazio Martire, in the hamlet of Casaletto.
 Chiesa di San Matto Apostolo, in the hamlet of San Matteo delle Chiaviche.
 Chiesa di Santa Maria Maddalena, in the hamlet of Bellaguarda.
 Chiesa di San Lodovico Re e Confessore, in the hamlet of Sabbioni.
 Chiesa di San Giovanni Battista, in the hamlet of Banzuolo.

Civil architectures 

 Palazzo del Municipio, historically Palazzo della Ragione, built in 1502.
 Arco Avigni o di Porta Nuova, built in 1826.
 Cinema Teatro Vittoria, on piazza Gramsci.

Culture 
Mu.Vi. is the name of the Multipurpose Cultural Center in Viadana that hosts cultural and recreational activities, exhibitions, and events. The acronym stands for Musei Viadana.

The center currently houses the Civic Gallery of Modern and Contemporary Art, the Permanente, the Fratelli Azzolini photography club, and the Luigi Parazzi municipal library, which is a member of the Sistema bibliotecario Ovest Mantovano . In addition, every month, it is possible to attend meetings of the Viadana Reading Group (Letto e Mangiato) with the background of books from the Municipal Library. The Mu.Vi. is on Via Manzoni, in the building of the former elementary school.

Anthropological geography 
The municipality of Viadana consists of several hamlets, including Cogozzo, Cicognara, Cizzolo, and San Matteo delle Chiaviche. The municipality is about 40 km from Mantua, 25 km from Parma, 30 km from Reggio Emilia, and 50 km from Cremona.

Fractions

Cizzolo 
Cizzolo (in dialect Sisöl) located in the northern part of the municipality. With its 800 inhabitants, it is the third most populous hamlet in the municipality of Viadana. Places of interest are the church of San Giacomo Maggiore Apostolo and the castle owned by the Frati family.

Cogozzo 
Cogozzo (in dialect Cugos) located next to Cicognara is one of the most industrialized hamlets of Viadana. It is also highly developed in agriculture, but sometimes the product is ruined because of nutria.

Cicognara 
Cicognara (in dialect, Sigugnéra), the westernmost hamlet of the Viadanese territory (bordering the territory of the municipality of Casalmaggiore) and the second in order of inhabitants after Cogozzo, has become famous for the great entrepreneurial spirit that has made it a major industrial reality, being able to count on several dozen small and medium-sized companies that provide employment for many people in the Oglio-Po district. The main activity of these small and medium-sized companies is the production of paintbrushes. In particular, as early as the mid-19th century, from the production of sorghum brooms (a trade that has practically disappeared locally today) to the production of brushes, taking advantage of the raw material used at the time, the bristles of pigs conspicuously bred in the Viadanese area. After the middle of the last century, Cicognara established itself as the main brush-making district.

The symbol of the town is a stork on a strip of land representing the Insula Cicunaria, an island on which the settlement arose and which was separated from the mainland by continuous flooding and the irregular course of the Po River, unlike what it looks like today. There is also a motto in Latin, Cicognara et Cogozzo essenti (usually accompanied by the stork emblem), which derives from the tax exemption granted to Cicognara (and Cogozzo precisely) from the time of Desiderio and maintained until the 18th century (Desiderio, born in Brescia, was king of the Lombards and king of Italy from 757 to 774). The patron saint of the village is Santa Giulia, to whom the parish church is dedicated; Don Primo Mazzolari was pastor from 1921 to 1932 and parishioner Grazia Deledda was married in 1900 to Rag. Palmiro Medesani from Cicognaro. Three valuable stained glass windows (the Nativity, the Holy Family, and St. Giulia) by Cremonese painter Giuseppe Moroni can be admired in the church. Also in the church was a Roman-era cippus datable to around 150 AD, while near the church stood the Monastery of St. Julia, founded in 758 by Ansa, Desiderio's wife.

San Matteo delle Chiaviche 
San Matteo delle Chiaviche is located at the confluence of the Po and Oglio rivers. The Torre d'Oglio boat bridge, which crosses the Oglio River at its confluence with the Po, is famous. It is the fourth-most populated hamlet of Viadana and is about 15 km from Viadana.

Buzzoletto 
Buzzoletto is located about 3 kilometers from the capital city. Once a purely agricultural center, it knows insawearly years of the 21st century a significant residential building expansion. The town is divided between the area of the "center" and the area of Via Codisotto, formerly Baruffaldi.

Economy 
An agricultural center rich in pig breeding, Viadana, similar to the other small towns of the Po Valley, underwent a rapid conversion to an industrial hub during the post-World War II period, which marked an economic and demographic expansion of the town.

Activities revolve around the textile industry, the wood panel manufacturing industry, and in the past ,,lso the brush industry. Other types of industries include meat processing and construction.

Infrastructure and transportation 
Historically accessible by river, thanks to its proximity to the Po, Viadana is located along State Road 358; Provincial Road 59 branches off from it at that location.

The town is served by the Brescello-Viadana station, located on the Emilia-Romagna side of the river along the Parma-Suzzara railroad, operated by FER and served by regional trains run by Tper under the service contract signed with the Emilia-Romagna Region.

Between 1886 and 1933 Viadana served as the southern terminus of another rail link, the Mantua-Viadana tramway, operated by the Valentini and Mazzorin company and, since 1903 directly by the provincial administration. There is also transportation by public Lili, operated by APAM Spa, connecting Viadana with the various towns in the Mantua area and the capital city of Mantua.

Sports

Football 
Unione Calcistica Viadana S.S.D. S.r.l. is the soccer team of the town of Viadana, currently playing in the First Category league, the fourth amateur and seventh rallseventh level of the Italian soccer league.

Rugby 
Rugby Viadana 1970 S.r.l. S.S.D. is the rugby club of the town of Viadana, Italian champion 2001-2002. Founded in 1970, it has been one of the leading formations on the national rugby scene in the 2000s. Currently, it plays in the Italian top division championship and holds its home matches at Luigi Zaffanella Stadium.

Basketball 
A.S.D. Basket Viadana is the men's basketball team of the town of Viadana. Founded in 1964, it currently plays in the national Serie C, the fourth level of the Italian basketball league.

Other sports societies 

 A.S.D. Viadana Volley
 A.S.D. Ginnastica Artistica Longoni Viadana
 A.S.D. Karate Viadana
 A.S.D. Viadana Nuoto Libertas
 Associazione Tennis Viadana
 A.S.D. Warriors Viadana - Wheelchair Hockey

Twin towns
 Cutro, Italy
 Kleszczów, Poland, since 2006
 Alba Iulia, Romania, since 2006

References

External links
 Official website

Cities and towns in Lombardy